The 820th Main Centre for Missile Attack Warning is the Russian early warning network against ballistic missile attack. It has headquarters in the village of Timonovo  near Solnechnogorsk outside Moscow and is part of the Russian Space Forces. The centre consists of a network of early warning radar stations which transmit their data to the control centre near Solnechnogorsk. Other information comes from the early warning Oko and EKS satellites as well as the Don-2N missile defence radar. Information from the centre could be used for a launch on warning nuclear missile attack or to engage the A-135 anti-ballistic missile system.

The Main Centre
The centre is the control centre for the radar network. Here signals from every station are received and, if necessary, a message can be sent to the presidential 'nuclear briefcase' for authorisation to use nuclear weapons. There is a communications centre which has a number of backup channels to communicate with each radar station. If a ballistic missile attack is discovered the duty commander reports this to the central command post of the General Staff.  At the same time the duty engineer reports it to the commander of the Aerospace Defence Forces, for redundancy.

Information comes from the radar network, early warning satellites and the space surveillance network SKKP. The centre also discovers and monitors space objects through the use of radar which are fed into the SKKP network.

Warning network

The Russian missile warning system originates in the Soviet Union and is often known by its Soviet initials SPRN (СПРН), from  'Missile attack warning system'. It started on 15 February 1971 as two Dnestr-M radars at Olenegorsk and Skrunda with a command post in Solnechnogorsk. It expanded by the addition of Dnestr-M radars in Mishelevka and Balkhash in 1973, a Dnepr radar in Sevastopol in 1975 and another in Mukachevo in 1977. The Daugava radar, a Daryal receiver, started operations in 1975 at Olenegorsk. In 1978 an upgraded warning system called Крокус (Krokus) was introduced.

In 1982 the Oko early warning satellite system became operational. It was joined in 1984 by the first Daryal radar in Pechora and in 1985 by the Daryal in Gabala.

The 1972 Anti-ballistic missile treaty requires that early warning radar stations are located on the periphery of national territory and face outwards. When the Soviet Union collapsed in 1991 this resulted in many of the stations ending up in newly independent states. The radar station at Skrunda, now in Latvia, closed in 1998. Other stations now overseas were Sevastopol and Mukachevo (both in Ukraine), Balkhash (Kazakhstan) and Gabala (Azerbaijan).

The Volga radar at Baranavichy in Belarus came online in 2003 and the two Ukrainian radars closed in 2009. In the mid-2000s Russia started the roll out of the next generation of early warning radar, the Voronezh. The first station in Lekhtusi near St Petersburg went on combat duty in 2012. Other stations in Kaliningrad and Armavir were made operational in the following years. In 2012, the Gabala Radar Station in Azerbaijan was dismantled following failure to renegotiate its continued use. The Russian military has expressed a desire to replace or replicate all overseas radars with domestic stations as overseas ones cannot be relied upon in times of tension and war. New stations were commissioned in locations such as Barnaul, Orsk, Orenburg and Yeniseysk.

On 4 October 2019, Sergei Boyev, director general of Vympel NPO, a major weapons manufacturer in Russia, confirmed to Russia's state-run media that the company was working on "modelling" the system for China. Russia hopes to integrate China's early warning system with Russia's. This will provide China with increased detection range from North pole as well as the Atlantic and Pacific Ocean.

Organisational structure
In 1998 SPRN became part of the missile and space defence organisation ракетно-космической обороны (RKO) together with SKKP and the anti-missile troops. In 2001 these services became part of the newly founded Space Troops, and were incorporated as the 3rd Independent Missile and Space Defense Army.

The Main Centre for Missile Attack Warning was formed on 1 December 2009 and since December 2011 it had been part of the Space Command of the Russian Aerospace Defence Forces, together with facilities such as the 821st Main Space Intelligence Centre and 153rd Titov Main Space Testing Centre.

References

Military installations of Russia
Russian Space Forces
Military installations of the Soviet Union